Shouzou Kaga (加賀昭三, Kaga Shōzō) is a Japanese video game designer and scenario writer best known as the creator of the Fire Emblem series. During his career at Intelligent Systems, he would lead the development of Fire Emblem from its inception until the release of Fire Emblem: Thracia 776. In addition to being development lead, he was a major creative contributor to each game's setting, story, and presentation.

Following his departure from Intelligent Systems in 1999, he continued work in game design by founding the independent studio Tirnanog and going on to develop the Tear Ring Saga series, initially under the name Emblem Saga. In 2001, the company would be sued by Nintendo on the grounds of copyright infringement against the Fire Emblem series. Following the release of Berwick Saga in 2005, Kaga took an apparent hiatus from video game production, lasting a decade until the production and release of Vestaria Saga in 2016.

Works

References

Living people
Nintendo people
Fire Emblem
Japanese video game designers
Video game writers